Aglaia beccarii is a tree in the family Meliaceae. The bark is greyish brown, greenish brown or white. The fruits are pink or reddish purple. The tree is named for the Italian botanist Odoardo Beccari. Habitat is forests from sea-level to  altitude. A. beccarii is found in Borneo and the Philippines.

References

beccarii
Plants described in 1894
Trees of Borneo
Trees of the Philippines